Diploglossus pleii, the Puerto Rican galliwasp, is a species of lizard of the Diploglossidae family endemic to Puerto Rico.

References

Diploglossus
Reptiles described in 1839
Reptiles of Puerto Rico
Endemic fauna of Puerto Rico
Taxa named by André Marie Constant Duméril
Taxa named by Gabriel Bibron